Felix Prohaska (16 May 191229 March 1987) was an Austrian conductor and professor of musicology in Hanover.

Education
Felix Prohaska, born in Vienna, was the son of the composer and professor Carl Prohaska (1869–1927). He received his music education from his father; he studied piano with Eduard Steuermann and music theory with Egon Kornauth and Hans Gál.

Career
Felix Prohaska started his career as a répétiteur at the opera of Graz (1936–1939), and subsequently worked as a conductor at the opera houses in Duisburg (1939–1941), Strasbourg (1941–1943), Prague, Salzburg and at the Vienna Volksoper (1946–1955). From 1955 to 1961 Prohaska occupied the position of assistant music director and conductor at the Städtische Bühnen Frankfurt. From 1961 to 1969 he was the director of the Akademie/Hochschule für Musik und Theater Hannover and held a position as professor for musicology until 1975. Prohaska conducted at the Vienna Volksoper (1964–1967) and at the Staatsoper Hannover (1965–1974). For a short time he also taught at the University of Music and Performing Arts Vienna. 

Recordings with Felix Prohaska conducting music by Johann Sebastian Bach, Wolfgang Amadeus Mozart, Franz Schubert and Gustav Mahler were issued by Vanguard Classics.

Felix Prohaska died in Vienna in 1987.

Family
Felix Prohaska was the son of Carl Prohaska and the grandfather of the singers Anna Prohaska and Daniel Prohaska.

Awards
 Walter Gieseking medal of Staatliche Hochschule für Musik und Theater Hannover

References

Sources
Felix Prohaska biography at bach-cantatas.com

 (death date 24 January 1991)

1912 births
1987 deaths
Male conductors (music)
Academic staff of the Hochschule für Musik, Theater und Medien Hannover
Musicians from Vienna
20th-century Austrian conductors (music)
20th-century Austrian male musicians